Rauf or Rawuf (Arabic: رَؤُوف ra’ūf or rawūf) is an Arabic male given name or surname which is a noun and the exaggerated form of the name Raif (or Raef) meaning "kind, affectionate, benign", "sympathetic, merciful" or compassionate. 

The name comes from the Arabic verb ra’afa (رَأَفَ) "to have compassion for, have mercy upon, be merciful toward".

However, the name Rauf is an exaggerated form and Raif is an agent noun which is also exaggerated in nature.

The name is also one of the names of Allah, al-Ra'uf or commonly "Ar-Ra'uf/ Rawuf", meaning "the Kind, the Pitying" or "Most Kind, the Ever-Compassionate".

Surname
Abdul Rauf (anti-Taliban cleric), Afghan cleric 
Abdul Rauf (Taliban governor), Taliban politician
Abdur Rauf (cricketer) (born 1978), Pakistani cricketer 
Asad Rauf (1956–2022), Pakistani cricketer 
Atif Rauf (born 1964), Pakistani cricketer
Bulent Rauf (1911–1987), Turkish-British mystic, spiritual teacher, translator and author
Faiza Rauf (1923–1994), Egyptian princess and a member of the Muhammad Ali Dynasty
Feisal Abdul Rauf (born 1948), American Sufi imam, author, and activist
Haris Rauf (born 1993), Pakistani cricketer
Javeria Rauf (born 1989), Pakistani cricketer
John Rauf (fl.1388), English politician
Mahmoud Abdul-Rauf (born 1969), American basketball player
Onjali Q. Raúf, English author and human rights campaigner
Rana Abdul Rauf (born 1953), Pakistani politician
Rashid Rauf (1981–2008), alleged Al-Qaeda operative

Given name
Rauf Rashid Abd al-Rahman (born c. 1941), Iraqi judge
Rauf Adigozalov (1940–2002), Azerbaijani violinist and singer
Rauf Aliyev (born 1989), Azerbaijani football player
Rauf Denktaş (1924–2012), first president of Northern Cyprus
Rauf Hasağası (1900–1992), Turkish sprinter
Rauf Huseynli (born 2000), Azerbaijani football player
Rauf Khalid (1957–2011), Pakistani actor 
Rauf Khalilov (born 1981), Azerbaijani film director
Rauf Klasra, Pakistani journalist
Rauf Lala (born 1970), Pakistani actor
Rauf Mamedov (born 1988), Azerbaijani chess player
Rauf Olaniyan (born 1960), Nigerian politician
Rauf Orbay (1881–1964), Turkish politician
Rauf Abu Al-Seoud (1915–1982), Egyptian diver
Rauf Siddiqui, Pakistani politician
Rauf Yekta (1871–1935), Turkish musician

See also
Rauf & Faik, Russian trap duo
, Liberia-flagged Turkish powership
Shahid Mohammad Rauf, a village in Beygom Qaleh Rural District, in the Central District of Naqadeh County, West Azerbaijan Province, Iran
Raouf

References

Arabic-language surnames
Turkish masculine given names